Seven Stars Halt railway station was located in the streets of Welshpool on the corner of Union Street. Seven Stars was an unstaffed request halt on the narrow gauge Welshpool and Llanfair Light Railway. It had a single ground level platform on the single track line, a name board, a sign warning passengers not to board until the train had stopped and a lean-to waiting shelter with a fence.

Opened as Welshpool Seven Stars in 6 April 1903 it was named after a pub of that name that had been demolished in 1901 to create space for the railway. Seven Stars was closed to passengers on 9 February 1931 by the Great Western Railway. and the line closed completely on 3 November 1956. The original  was the next station on the line towards Llanfair Caereinion and the line's station at Welshpool was the previous one.

Notes

References 
 
 Rushton, Gordon (2015). The Welshpool & Llanfair Railway  Travellers's Guide. Llanfair Caereinion : Welshpool & Llanfair Railway. 
 Wignall, C.J. (1983). Complete British Railways Maps and Gazetteer from 1830 - 1981. Oxford : Oxford Publishing Co.

External links
 Through The Streets of Welshpool By Rail HD Microsoft Train Simulator.

Welshpool and Llanfair Light Railway
former Cambrian Railway stations
Railway stations opened in 1903
Railway stations closed in 1931